Bloody Romance is an upcoming South Korean television series starring Nam Gyu-ri, Kim Min-seok and Song Jae-rim. It is scheduled for release on JTBC.

Synopsis
The series tells the romance between a South Korean world star who has enlisted in the military due to some form of conspiracy, and a North Korean female soldier.

Cast

Main
 Nam Gyu-ri as Baek Young-ok, a second lieutenant who leads North Korea's eighth army in the special forces.
 Kim Min-seok as Lloyd, a South Korean world-class star who has female fans across the globe.
 Song Jae-rim as Sung Jae-hoon, a special forces soldier in the North Korean army.

Supporting
 Hong Seo-hee as Ji-ni Yoon
 Jeon Seung-hoon as Jang Cheol-gyu
 Choi Hye-jin as Seo Hee-ji
 Han Seung-bin as Seung-min
 Kim Na-yeon as Han Song-i
 Lee Jeong-hyun as Gye Nam-sik
 Kim Jung-young as Jeong Geum-suk
 Jung Jin-woo as Dong-pil
 Noh Sang-hyun as John Kim
 Park Hyun-sook as Won Tae-sook

References

External links

 

Korean-language television shows
JTBC television dramas
Television series by JTBC Studios
South Korean romance television series
South Korean military television series
North Korea in fiction
Works about North Korea–South Korea relations

Upcoming television series